Matilda Emily Mary "Tilly" Bagshawe (born 12 June 1973) is a British freelance journalist and author. She is best known for her books  in the vein of best-selling American author Sidney Sheldon, notably Sidney Sheldon's Mistress of the Game and Sidney Sheldon's After the Darkness.

Life and work
Born on 12 June 1973 in Lambeth Hospital, London, Bagshawe is one of three daughters born to Nicholas Wilfrid Bagshawe and his wife, Daphne Margaret (née Triggs). Her father is from the Bagshawe family of Roman Catholic gentry. They originally hailed from Wormhill Hall, near Buxton, Derbyshire, and Oakes-in-Norton, near Sheffield. Her great-grandfather was the marine artist Joseph Ridgard Bagshawe, who was himself grandson of one of the 19th century's most renowned marine artists, Clarkson Stanfield, and a nephew of Edward Gilpin Bagshawe, Catholic Bishop of Nottingham. Her paternal grandmother, Mary Frideswide, was the daughter of Charles Robertson, a stockbroker and benefactor of St Philip's Priory, Begbroke and one of the co-founders of Westminster Cathedral. Her older sister is Louise Mensch, a chick lit author and former Conservative Member of Parliament. She has another sister Alice and a brother, James.

She was educated at Woldingham School, Surrey, and while there, she became pregnant. At seventeen, she was a single mother of a daughter, Persephone (Sefi), but she finished her studies and at the age of eighteen, she went up to St John's College, Cambridge with her ten-month-old daughter in tow.

Married to Robin Nydes, a US businessman, she lives between homes in London and Los Angeles, with three children. Now a freelance journalist and novelist, Bagshawe is a regular contributor to The Sunday Times, Daily Mail and other British publications.

Bibliography

Novels
 Adored (2005/Jul).
 Showdown (2006).
 Do Not Disturb (2008).
 Flawless (2009).
 Scandalous (2010).
 Fame (2011)
 Temptation (2012)
 The Inheritance (2014)
 The Show (2015)
 The Bachelor (2016)
 Friends and Rivals

Sidney Sheldon series
 Sidney Sheldon's Mistress of the Game (2009/Aug).
 Sidney Sheldon's After the Darkness (2010/Jun).
 Sidney Sheldon's Angel of the Dark (2012)
 Sidney Sheldon's The Tides of Memory  (2013)
 Sidney Sheldon's Chasing Tomorrow  (2014/Sep)
 Sidney Sheldon's Reckless  (2015)
Sidney Sheldon's The Silent Widow (2018)
Sidney Sheldon's The Phoenix (2019)

M. B. Shaw novels 
 Murder at the Mill (2017)

References

1973 births
Living people
21st-century English novelists
21st-century English women writers
English journalists
English Roman Catholics
English women novelists
Alumni of St John's College, Cambridge
People educated at Woldingham School
English women non-fiction writers